Černíkovice is a municipality and village in Rychnov nad Kněžnou District in the Hradec Králové Region of the Czech Republic. It has about 800 inhabitants.

Administrative parts

The village of Domašín is an administrative part of Černíkovice.

Geography
It lies in the Orlice Table. There are four ponds in the municipal territory, the largest of them is Černíkovický.

References

External links

Villages in Rychnov nad Kněžnou District